Northern Fleet may refer to:

Fleets
Northern Fleet, Soviet and Russian fleet based on the White and Barents Seas
Northern Fleet (Iran), Iranian fleet in the Caspian Sea
Northern Fleet (English Navy), medieval English fleet in the North Sea

Other
Northern Fleet Joint Strategic Command (Russia), former name of the Russian Northern Military District
Northern Fleet (video game)

See also
Northern Afleet, a racehorse